Russell Rovers is a Gaelic football and hurling club based in the village of Shanagarry, County Cork, Ireland. The club draws its support from Churchtown South, Ballycotton, Garryvoe and Shanagarry itself. It competes in competitions organised by Cork county board and the Imokilly divisional board.

History
The club was founded in 1930. It was popularly believed that the club acquired its name from the neighbouring townland of Ballyrussell, while other research suggests that it was possibly named after a Fr. John Russell who was Parish Priest of Cloyne in the 1840s. Fr. Russell was a prominent and sometimes controversial figure, and a prolific letter-writer - as can be seen from correspondence with the Cork Examiner and Cork Constitution newspapers in October 1848 when he took issue with the local Protestant curate of Ballycotton, whom he accused of proselytism; i.e., of bribing hungry children with food to attend Protestant schools. Fr. Russell is also credited with assisting in setting up National Schools in the area.

After winning the club's first Cork Junior A and Munster Junior Club Hurling Championship finals in 2019, the club progressed to the 2019–20 All-Ireland Junior Club Hurling Championship final, after beating Mícheál Breathnach CLG of Galway in the semi-final. The club ended their run as runners-up to Conahy Shamrocks in the final.

Honours
 All-Ireland Junior Club Hurling Championship Runners-up 2020
 Munster Junior Club Hurling Championship Winners (1) 2019
 Cork Junior A Hurling Championship Winners (1) 2019  Runner up 2018
 East Cork Junior A Hurling Championship Winners (2) 2018, 2019   Runner up 2006, 2017
 East Cork Junior A Hurling League Winners (2) 2017, 2018
 East Cork Junior B Hurling Championship Winners (5) 1945, 1958, 1963, 1978, 2002
 East Cork Junior C Hurling Championship Winners (1) 2014
 East Cork Junior A Football Championship Winners (1) 1931
 Cork Junior B Inter-Divisional Football Championship Winners (1) 2018
 East Cork Junior B Football Championship Winners (2) 1986, 2018
 Cork Minor C Hurling Championship Winners (1) 2007
 Cork Minor C Football Championship Winners (1) 2007

Notable players
 Kevin Hartnett

References

External links
 East Cork GAA - Clubs - Russell Rovers GAA

Gaelic games clubs in County Cork
Gaelic football clubs in County Cork
Hurling clubs in County Cork
1930 establishments in Ireland